The Flag of the Department of Casanare is a symbol of the Colombian Department of Casanare.

Description
The flag is divided diagonally from the upper-fly corner to the lower-hoist corner. The upper-hoist triangle is red and the lower-fly triangle, green. At the center of the flag is an eight pointed sun in yellow.

Meaning 
 The color red symbolizes the blood spilled by its heroes.
 The color green its natural resources and its prairies.
 The charge is a sun with eight corners that represent each letter of the word CASANARE.

References

External links
https://www.casanare.gov.co/index.php?idcategoria=1213

Flags of the departments of Colombia
Casanare Department